Georgy Karlov (born January 4, 1971,  Yuzhno-Sakhalinsk) is a Russian political figure and deputy of the 6th, 7th, and 8th State Dumas.

From 1991 to 2001, Karlov headed the Department of Consumer Market, Trade and Services at the Administration of Sakhalin Oblast. In 2004–2005, he served as a vice-governor of the region. He left the post to engage in business, but in 2008  Karlov was elected as a deputy of the Sakhalin Oblast Duma. In 2011, he was elected deputy of the 6th State Duma from the Sakhalin Oblast constituency. He was re-elected in 2016 and 2021 for the 7th, and 8th State Dumas respectively.

In 2019, Georgy Karlov became the second wealthiest deputy of the 7th State Duma.

References

1971 births
Living people
United Russia politicians
21st-century Russian politicians
Eighth convocation members of the State Duma (Russian Federation)